Mateo Retegui (born 29 April 1999) is a professional footballer who plays as a forward for Tigre on loan from Boca Juniors and the Italian national team.

Club career
Retegui began his senior career with Boca Juniors, who signed him years prior from River Plate. He was first promoted into the club's first-team by manager Guillermo Barros Schelotto during the 2017–18 Argentine Primera División season, appearing as an unused substitute on occasions against Arsenal de Sarandí and Estudiantes in December 2017. His professional debut arrived on 17 November 2018, with the forward being substituted on for the final moments of a 1–0 home win over Patronato.

January 2019 saw Retegui loaned to Estudiantes for eighteen months. He appeared eight times in 2018–19, before scoring five goals in twenty-one appearances in 2019–20.

In February 2022, Retegui joined Tigre on a loan deal until the end of 2023.

International career
Retegui represented Argentina at U19 and U20 level, including for the latter at the 2018 South American Games.

Being eligible to play for Italy through descent, on February 2023 it was reported Retegui was pre-selected by Roberto Mancini to join the Azzurri team for the first UEFA Euro 2024 qualification games. On 17 March 2023, Retegui received his first official call up to the Italian national team.

Personal life
Retegui is the son of former field hockey player Carlos Retegui, who represented Argentina at various Pan American Games. Retegui is represented by Francesco Totti's agency.

He owns also Italian citizenship through his maternal grandfather, who was originally from Canicattì, Sicily.

Career statistics

References

External links

1999 births
Living people
People from San Fernando Partido
Argentine footballers
Argentina youth international footballers
Argentina under-20 international footballers
Argentine people of Italian descent
Association football forwards
Argentine Primera División players
Boca Juniors footballers
Estudiantes de La Plata footballers
Talleres de Córdoba footballers
Club Atlético Tigre footballers
Sportspeople from Buenos Aires Province